The Palm IIIc was the first colour PDA made by Palm, Inc., released in February 2000 for $449USD. It ran Palm OS 3.5, the first Palm OS version to have native colour support and supported paletted 8-bit colour modes. Using the Palm OS Upgrade Install CD, the Palm IIIc could be updated to Palm OS 4.1. The machine has a TFT LCD that is bright indoors. The Palm IIIc features the classic III-series connector, 8MB of RAM and a 20MHz DragonBall EZI CPU. The unit also has a lithium ion rechargeable battery and a slightly modified version of the original Palm III chassis.

See also
List of Palm OS Devices

References

External links
 Palm, Inc. Introduces The Palm IIIc Product Industry's Smallest, Lightest Color Handheld Computer, Palm Press Release, February 22, 2000

Palm OS devices
68k-based mobile devices